Terrell Bonds (born July 22, 1996) is an American football cornerback for the San Antonio Brahmas of the XFL. He played college football at Tennessee State. Bonds played in the Alliance of American Football for the Memphis Express before it folded.

Professional career

Memphis Express
Bonds played for the Memphis Express of the AAF for all 8 weeks until the league folded. He had a total of 14 tackles and a blocked punt for a touchdown

Baltimore Ravens
After the AAF ceased operations in April 2019, Bonds signed with the Baltimore Ravens of the National Football League on May 6, 2019. Bonds was released on August 31, 2019 as part of their final roster cuts, but later re-signed to the practice squad. He signed a reserve/future contract with the Ravens on January 13, 2020.

Bonds was waived on September 5, 2020, and re-signed to the practice squad the next day. He was elevated to the active roster on September 28 and October 31 for the team's weeks 3 and 8 games against the Kansas City Chiefs and Pittsburgh Steelers, and reverted to the practice squad after each game. He was placed on the practice squad/COVID-19 list by the team on November 3, 2020, and activated back to the practice squad four days later. He was promoted to the active roster on November 7. He was placed on injured reserve on November 17, 2020, after suffering a knee injury in Week 10. He was placed back on the COVID-19 list on November 30, 2020, and moved back to injured reserve on December 15. He was activated on December 31, 2020, but waived a day later and re-signed to the practice squad on January 4, 2021. His practice squad contract with the team expired after the season on January 25, 2021.

Miami Dolphins 
The Miami Dolphins signed Bonds to a reserve/future contract on January 26, 2021. He was waived on August 21, 2021.

Pittsburgh Maulers
Bonds was selected in the 9th round of the 2022 USFL Draft by the Pittsburgh Maulers.

Tennessee Titans
On August 3, 2022, Bonds signed with the Tennessee Titans. He was waived ten days later.

San Antonio Brahmas 
On November 17, 2022, Bonds was drafted by the San Antonio Brahmas of the XFL.

References

External links
Baltimore Ravens bio

1996 births
Living people
American football cornerbacks
Baltimore Ravens players
Miami Central Senior High School alumni
Miami Dolphins players
Memphis Express (American football) players
Players of American football from Miami
Pittsburgh Maulers (2022) players
San Antonio Brahmas players
Tennessee State Tigers football players
Tennessee Titans players